Horton Town is an unincorporated community in Washington County, in the U.S. state of Missouri.

The community has the name of the Horton family, original owners of the site.

References

Unincorporated communities in Washington County, Missouri
Unincorporated communities in Missouri